The Men's 200 Freestyle at the 11th FINA World Aquatics Championships swam 25+26 July 2005 in the Olympic pool at Parc Jean-Drapeau in Montreal, Canada. 95 swimmers were entered in the Preliminary heats, which swam in the morning of July 25. The top-16 swimmers from the Prelims advanced on to Semifinal heats that evening. From the Semifinals, the top-8 swimmers advanced onto the next night's Final.

The existing records at the start of the event were:
World record (WR): 1:44.06, Ian Thorpe (Australia), 25 July 2001 in Fukuoka, Japan.
Championship record (CR): same

Results

Final

Semifinals

Prelims

See also
Swimming at the 2003 World Aquatics Championships – Men's 200 metre freestyle
Swimming at the 2004 Summer Olympics – Men's 200 metre freestyle
Swimming at the 2007 World Aquatics Championships – Men's 200 metre freestyle

References

FINA Worlds 2005: Men's 200 Freestyle heats results from OmegaTiming.com (official timer of the 2005 Worlds). Published 2005-07-30, retrieved 2009-08-21.
FINA Worlds 2005: Men's 200 Freestyle semifinals results from OmegaTiming.com (official timer of the 2005 Worlds). Published 2005-07-30, retrieved 2009-08-21.
FINA Worlds 2005: Men's 200 Freestyle final results from OmegaTiming.com (official timer of the 2005 Worlds). Published 2005-07-30, retrieved 2009-08-21.

Swimming at the 2005 World Aquatics Championships